Nav may refer to:
 Nav, Ardabil
 Nav, Asalem (ناو - Nāv), Talesh County, Gilan Province
 Nav, Haviq (نو -Nav), Talesh County, Gilan Province
 Nav-e Bala, Talesh County, Gilan Province
 Nav-e Pain, Talesh County, Gilan Province
 Nav, Kurdistan (ناو - Nāv)